Gertrude Falk (August 24, 1925 – March 9, 2008) was an American physiologist, who was Professor of Physiology at University College London, and the first woman to work in her field at UCL Medical School.  Born to immigrant parents in the United States, she was the first in her family to enroll at University, earning Bachelor of Science and Doctor of Philosophy degrees. Falk worked at the University of Illinois College of Medicine, University of Washington and UCL Medical School. She and neuroscientist Paul Fatt researched cellular biophysics to find how the retina converts light into electrical signals, and later worked alongside Jonathan Ashmore in demonstrating that light responses can be increased significantly at the synthase between the rod bipolar cell and photoreceptor cell.

Biography
Gertrude Falk was born in Brooklyn, New York City on August 24, 1925. Her mother was a Lithuanian who entered the United States at the age of 16, only able to speak Yiddish, and her immigrant father operated a furrier shop during the Great Depression. Falk had one sister. She worked as a guard at her father's shop, and helped him to conceal non-unionized workers in the cupboard when inspectors visited the shop. Falk expressed a desire to enroll at university though her traditionalist parents objected to this. Nevertheless, she became the first member of her family to attend university by enrolling at Antioch College, Ohio, one of the few universities not to bar black students and impose quotas on Jews. Falk graduated from the college with a Bachelor of Science in 1947. She went on to study at University of Chicago, undertaking postgraduate research on diuresis (the increase in production of urine by a rat's kidneys), earning her a Doctor of Philosophy (PhD).

Falk began her academic career at the University of Illinois College of Medicine, where she worked from 1952 to 1953, before moving to the University of Chicago as an instructor in natural science between 1953 and 1954. She moved to the University of Washington, Seattle in 1954, working as an instructor, and later as assistant to the professor of paracetamol. Falk left the University of Washington in 1961. That year, she flew to England as a Guggenheim Fellow to join the biophysics department of UCL Medical School, becoming the first woman to hold a professional chair at the department. There, Falk worked on the high capacitance of human muscle with a colleague, neuroscientist Paul Fatt. The two utilized two electrode recording techniques, requiring an comprehensive of real biophysics that explained how the retina converts light into electrical signals. A conclusion was reached the internal membranes accounted for the same high capacitance.

She also worked with Andrew Field Huxley in 1963 and Bernard Katz in 1970. Falk and Fatt later researched cellular biophysics to increase awareness of phototransduction of the retina. In 1974, Falk and physicist Jonathan Ashmore worked on a post-doctorate to demonstrate that light responses can be increased significantly at the synthase between the rod bipolar cell and photoreceptor cell. Throughout the 1990s, she and Richard Shiells pioneered the use of micro-electrodes to analyse a solitary bipolar cell.

Outside her academic work, Falk was a decades-long member of the Hampstead Labour Party, working in campaigning and fundraising from her home in Hampstead Hill Gardens. However, she was opposed to the 2003 invasion of Iraq and New Labour, which fellow party members described as "the party moved away from her." Falk heavily campaigned in support of the National Health Service (NHS), and she protested against a perceived threat to privatize it, which she feared would create a situation in which there would be an "Americanised service, where people will have to pay for healthcare through insurance, as has happened with dentists in this country".

She was a signatory to British Friends of Peace Now and Jews for Justice for Palestinians, and was a treasurer for Mapam UK (now Meretz UK). Falk was a strong supporter of Israel and the withdrawal of its military forces from the West Bank and the Gaza Strip. In 2007, Falk wrote to Camden New Journal about the cuts to the mental health service budget to hospitals in Camden Town. She and two personal friends spent much of the year protesting outside the Royal Free Hospital. Falk died after a short illness on March 9, 2008, and she was given a funeral in Golders Green on March 17.

Personality and personal life

Falk was described by Lawrence Joffe of The Guardian as "small of stature" and "a legendary conversationalist". She was outspoken, had a sense of humor, sympathy for those individuals considered the underdog, and friends and colleagues called her "a generous, warm and intellectually challenging person." Falk was briefly married to Paul Fatt, with whom she had a daughter; the two remained on amicable terms after they were divorced.

Legacy
The STS Gertrude Falk Prize was established by the University College London in her honor to award the "top overall performance through any STS iBSc year".

Selected publications

References

1925 births
2008 deaths
People from Brooklyn
Jewish women
American people of Lithuanian descent
Antioch College alumni
University of Chicago alumni
University of Washington faculty
University of Chicago faculty
Academics of University College London
20th-century American women scientists
21st-century American women scientists
American physiologists
Women physiologists
American women academics